The Meinong Hakka Culture Museum is a cultural museum in Meinong District, Kaohsiung, Taiwan.

History
During the opening ceremony speech on 28 April 2001, President Chen Shui-bian emphasized the effort by the central government to preserve Hakka culture and give it the recognition it deserves.

Architecture
The museum building consists of 2 floors. The museum design was inspired by simplicity and minimalism. Combining the architecture of tobacco (curing) shed and traditional trilateral courtyard house, it embraces innovation and modernity.

Exhibitions
The museum displays Hakka and Meinong culture and history, emphasizing the relationship between the people and their environment.

See also
 List of museums in Taiwan

References

2001 establishments in Taiwan
Hakka museums in Taiwan
Museums established in 2001
Museums in Kaohsiung